The Turkish Military Academy is a four-year co-educational military academy and part of the National Defence University. It is located in the center of Ankara, Turkey. Its mission is to develop cadets mentally and physically for service as commissioned officers in the Turkish Army, and is the oldest of the academies of the Armed Forces (opened 1834).

After 2016 Turkish coup d'état attempt Military academy (along with Naval Academy, Air Force Academy and all the other military educational institutions) became part of the new National Defence University which is formed under Ministry of National Defence.

Entry process
There are roughly 4,000 cadets attending the Turkish Military Academy at any one time. In order to enter the academy, prospective cadets must graduate from a high school then pass necessary exams and various tests. Only students displaying the potential to become officers are accepted. The Academy is the only source of commissioned officers for the Turkish Army. After graduation, cadets are required to serve for 15 years.

Education 
Education in the academy is 5 years (first year is preparatory class). Cadets undergo both academic and military training in the academy. Upon graduation cadets commissioned as officers in the Turkish Land Forces and also receive a bachelor's degree depending on their academic education in the academy.

Military training is given by the Turkish Military Academy Cadet Corps. The corps is organized as one regiment and four battalion.

Uniforms 
The cadet dress uniform is the same as the Turkish Army officer's uniform, except for the addition of two gold cords looped from the right shoulder across the front right suspending two metal pins. One pin is long, and symbolizes peace while the other is short and symbolizes war. The cadets are distinguishable and organized by their graduating class as well as their cadet unit. In their classroom uniform, each cadet wears a thin gold bar on their epilate for each year they have been at the academy. Senior cadets, with four bars, also wear the color of the branch of the Turkish Army that they will be entering upon graduation on their collar. For example, green for infantry and gray for armor. The under three classes wear blue on their collar which signifies that they have not yet chosen a branch. The cadet also wears an identification number, a four digit number issued upon entrance to the academy. Atatürk's cadet number, 1283, has been reserved and will not be issued to another cadet.

Turkish Military Academy Cadet Corps 

Turkish Military Academy Cadet Corps is made up of one regiment and four battalions named after famous campaigns during the Turkish War of Independence and WWI (except Malazgirt). 1st Battalion is the Anafartalar Battalion, 2nd is the Dumlupinar Battalion, 3rd is the Sakarya Battalion and 4th is the Malazgirt Battalion. Each battalion has a separate building, which contains a number of facilities including barracks, dining halls, classrooms, day rooms and study rooms. The cadet regiment has a cadet chain of command which rotates during the school year. The cadet regiment also has a chain of command of regular army officers in mentoring and leadership roles.

Other military academies 
 Ottoman Military College (Erkân-ı Harbiye Mektebi) which trained regular officers to become staff officers,
 Armed Forces College (Silahlı Kuvvetler Akademisi/Müşterek Harp Enstitüsü)
 National Security College (Milli Güvenlik Akademisi/Milli Savunma ve Güvenlik Enstitüsü) which civilian students (high level state executives) attends along with high level military officers.

See also
 Turkish Air Force Academy
 Turkish Naval Academy

References

External links

 Kara Harp Okulu

 
1834 establishments in the Ottoman Empire
Clemens Holzmeister buildings and structures
Military units and formations established in 1834